Harriman Glacier is an  long glacier in the U.S. state of Alaska.
It was named by members of the 1899 Harriman Alaska Expedition after Edward H. Harriman, who funded the expedition.

See also
 List of glaciers

References

Glaciers of Alaska
Glaciers of Anchorage, Alaska
Glaciers of Chugach Census Area, Alaska
Glaciers of Unorganized Borough, Alaska